I and II (pronounced "one" and "two", stylized as . I : and : I I .) are the twelfth and thirteenth studio albums by American guitarist John Frusciante. Both albums were released on February 3, 2023, through Avenue 66 (Acid Test Records). I is a vinyl-only release containing seven tracks, while II is a digital and CD release featuring more material. Frusciante stated that the former album would include an exclusive track and that the lack of certain material is due to the fact that certain material on II contains "sounds that can not be pressed on vinyl".

Frusciante said the albums contrasted with the structured rock songs he contributed to while working on the Red Hot Chili Peppers albums Unlimited Love and Return of the Dream Canteen (both released in 2022), stating that "After a year and a half writing and recording rock music, I needed to clear my head. I listened to and made music where things generally happen gradually rather than suddenly."

Frusciante primarily used analog technology for the making of the album, utilizing synthesizers such as the Elektron Monomachine and Analog Four MK II. Among the artists and pieces listed as influences over the album were Jimi Hendrix's "...And the Gods Made Love" and the ambient music of Brian Eno.

Track listings

All songs written by John Frusciante.

I

II

References

2023 albums
John Frusciante albums